Malev (English release title: Men at Arms) is a 2005 Estonian comedy film directed by Kaaren Kaer. The film depicts Estonian adventures during 13th-century when heathen Estonians are going to be christianized.

Cast
Ott Sepp as Uru Tark
Mirtel Pohla as Ilge
Uku Uusberg as	Tugis
Argo Aadli	as Leholas
Üllar Saaremäe	as Mentor Wolfram
Mait Malmsten as Brother Wismuth
Ain Mäeots as Lembitu
Merle Jääger as Lembela
Märt Avandi as	Jūrmala  bailiff Hippolyt
Raivo E. Tamm	as Bishop Albert
Anti Kobin	 as	Manivalde
Sergo Vares as	Henry of Livonia
Kusti Laid	as Young Uru
Tarmo Tagamets	as Brother Joschka / Vesse
Dajan Ahmet as Chingis-Khan
Mihkel Kabel as Pent, Elder of Nurmekundla
Ago Anderson as Elder of Alempoistla
Tarmo Männard as Elder of Ridala
Feliks Kark as Elder of Mõhu
Janek Joost as Elder of Ugandi
Elmar Trink as	Elder of Jogentagana
Markus Luik as	Nuntsius
Ago Roo as	Pope Innocentius III
Aivar Rand	as Telemachos
Margo Sooäär as Master of German Order
Jim Ashilevi as Kaupo (uncredited)
Kaspar Jancis as Drunken German Soldier (uncredited)
Rasmus Kaljujärv as Drunken German Soldier (uncredited)
Jaak Kilmi	as Drunken German Soldier (uncredited)
Anton Klink as Soldier (uncredited)
Kertu Köösel as Battle Virgin Krõõt (uncredited)
Siim Maaten as	Son of Vesse (uncredited)
Aivo Sadam	as French Eggscraper (uncredited)
Tiit Sukk	as Koopa Tark (uncredited)

References

External links
 
 Malev (film), Estonian Film Database (EFIS)

2005 films
Estonian comedy films
Estonian-language films